Davis Thompson (born June 5, 1999) is an American professional golfer who plays on the PGA Tour. He won the 2022 Rex Hospital Open and was number one in the World Amateur Golf Ranking in 2020 and 2021.

Amateur career
Thompson was born in Auburn, Alabama and attended the Lee-Scott Academy, which he helped win six consecutive team state titles (2012–2017). He captured the individual state title in 2013 and 2015.

He played collegiately at the University of Georgia for four seasons between 2017 and 2021, where he earned All-America First Team laurels his final two years, and was the 2021 Southeastern Conference Player of the Year. He won four individual titles at Georgia, including the NCAA Regionals in 2019 and 2021.

Thompson won the 2020 Jones Cup Invitational, and was runner-up at the event in 2019 and 2020. He was the stroke play medalist at the 2019 Western Amateur. 

He played in the 2020 Arnold Palmer Cup and the 2021 Walker Cup.

Thompson reached number one in the World Amateur Golf Ranking in November 2020 and March 2021, and finished number two in the inaugural PGA Tour University Class of 2021.

Professional career
Thompson turned professional after his graduation in 2021 and joined the Korn Ferry Tour. 

He shot a bogey-free 9-under 63 to hold a two-stroke lead after the first round of the Rocket Mortgage Classic before finishing T58 in his seventh career PGA Tour start and third as a professional.

Thompson earned his card for the 2022–23 PGA Tour as he finished the 2022 Korn Ferry Tour season 16th on the points list, recording four top-10s, including a win at the Rex Hospital Open on his 23rd birthday. 

In 2023, he was runner-up at The American Express, one stroke behind Jon Rahm, after his putt on the penultimate hole stroke the pin nearly dead-center and ricochet a foot and a half past.

Amateur wins
2019 NCAA Athens Regional, Jim Rivers Intercollegiate
2020 Jones Cup Invitational
2021 Tiger Invitational, NCAA Tallahassee Regional

Source:

Professional wins (1)

Korn Ferry Tour wins (1)

Results in major championships

CUT = missed the half-way cut
"T" = tied for place
NT = No tournament due to COVID-19 pandemic

Results in The Players Championship

U.S. national team appearances
Amateur
Arnold Palmer Cup: 2020
Walker Cup: 2021 (winners)

See also
2022 Korn Ferry Tour Finals graduates

References

External links

American male golfers
Georgia Bulldogs men's golfers
PGA Tour golfers
Golfers from Alabama
Sportspeople from Auburn, Alabama
People from St. Simons, Georgia
1999 births
Living people